Sujawal District is a district of the Sindh province of Pakistan. It is located at 24°36'23" North and 68°4'19" East and is bordered in the northwest by the Indus river, which separates it from Thatta District. The district has an area of 7335 km2.

Administration
Sujawal District is subdivided into five tehsils: 
 Jati, 
 Kharo Chan, 
 Mirpur Bathoro Tehsil,
 Shah Bandar Tehsil 
 and Sujawal Tehsil.

History and geography 
The decision to divide Thatta District into two districts by the provincial government was made on 12 October 2013 through a notification issued by the Revenue Department of Sindh. The provincial revenue department said:

According to the notification, the right side of the Indus River will comprise the old Thatta district, and the left side will come under the jurisdiction of the newly created Sujawal. The Thatta District (among the largest districts of the province area-wise), will have half the size in its new boundaries, comprising Thatta, Mirpur Sakro, Keti Bunder and Ghorabari tehsils (talukas). In addition, some areas of Kharochhan tehsil (taluka) have also been included in the new Thatta District. The historical city of Thatta, which was once the capital of Sindh, was carved out from Karachi as a separate city in August 1948. It was the second largest district in Sindh, in terms of area, covering over 17,335 square kilometers before its recent separation into two parts. The Provincial Revenue Department of Sindh Notification 12 October 2013. There are two Provincial Assembly seats, Constituency PS-86 and Constituency PS-87, and one National Assembly seat, Constituency NA-238, in the newly formed districts of Sujawal.

Demography
At the time of the 2017 census, Sujawal district had a population of 779,062, of which 404,810 were males and 374,142 females. The rural population was 693,566 (89.03%) and urban 85,496 (10.97%). The literacy rate is 25.12%: 33.14% for males and 16.14% for females.

The majority religion is Islam, with 96.94% of the population. Hinduism (including those from Scheduled Castes) is practiced by 2.92% of the population. Sindhi is the dominant language, spoken by 97.95% of the population.

See also
 Thatta District
 List of talukas of Sindh
 Sindh
 Kot Aalam

References

External links

 
Districts of Sindh